Cyrtostachys kisu is a species of flowering plant in the family Arecaceae. It is found only in Solomon Islands. It is threatened by habitat loss.

References

kisu
Flora of the Solomon Islands (archipelago)
Data deficient plants
Endemic flora of the Solomon Islands
Taxonomy articles created by Polbot